Kokarai (Pashto: کوکارۍ) is an administrative unit, known as Union council or Wards in Tehsil Babuzai, of Swat District in the Khyber Pakhtunkhwa province of Pakistan.

According to the Khyber Pakhtunkhwa Local Government Act 2013, the Swat District has 67 Wards, of which the total number of Village Councils is 170, and the number of Neighbourhood Councils is 44.

Kokarai is Territorial  Ward, which is further divided in four Village Councils:
 Ashargarai (Village Council)
 Jambil (Village Council)
 Kokarai No. 1 (Village Council)
 Kokarai No. 2 (Village Council)

Kokarai is surrounded by high, green mountains. Its people are agricultural.

See also 
 Babuzai
 Swat District

References

External links
Khyber-Pakhtunkhwa Government website section on Lower Dir
United Nations
Hajjinfo.org Uploads
 PBS paiman.jsi.com

Swat District
Populated places in Swat District
Union councils of Khyber Pakhtunkhwa
Union Councils of Swat District